Meng Weiqiang (born May 31, 1989) is a Chinese baseball catcher who plays with the Guangdong Leopards in the China Baseball League. 

Meng represented China at the 2012 Asia Series, 2012 Asian Baseball Championship, 2013 World Baseball Classic, 2013 East Asian Games, 2014 Asian Games, 2015 Asian Baseball Championship, 2017 World Baseball Classic and 2018 Asian Games.

References

1989 births
Living people
Asian Games competitors for China
Baseball catchers
Baseball outfielders
Baseball pitchers
Chinese expatriate baseball players in the United States
Baseball players at the 2014 Asian Games
Baseball players at the 2018 Asian Games
Guangdong Leopards players
Texas AirHogs players
2013 World Baseball Classic players
2017 World Baseball Classic players